The Bishop of St Andrews, Dunkeld and Dunblane is the Ordinary of the Scottish Episcopal Diocese of St Andrews, Dunkeld and Dunblane. The see is located at St Ninian's Cathedral in Perth, Scotland.

Following the Glorious Revolution, the Church of Scotland abolished the Episcopacy in 1689 and adopted a Presbyterian government. The Episcopalian remnant slowly formed the independent Scottish Episcopal Church. In the 19th century, the three dioceses were gradually merged to become the present Diocese of St Andrews, Dunkeld and Dunblane. The see is currently vacant; an electoral synod convened to elect the next bishop on 2 June 2018, electing Ian Paton. The previous bishop of the united diocese was the Right Reverend David Chillingworth.

List of Office holders

Archbishops of St Andrews

Bishops of Fife

Bishops of Fife, Dunkeld and Dunblane

Bishops of St Andrews, Dunkeld and Dunblane

See also

Archbishop of St Andrews, the pre-Reformation and Church of Scotland Archbishop.
Archbishop of St. Andrews and Edinburgh, the current Roman Catholic Archbishop.
Lists of office-holders

References

External links
 Crockford's Clerical Directory - Listings

 
Lists of Anglican bishops and archbishops
People associated with Fife
People associated with Perth and Kinross